KNEZ (107.3 MHz, "La Mejor 107.3") is a radio station broadcasting a Spanish oldies format. Licensed to Hazen, Nevada, United States, the station is currently owned by Alfredo Plascencia, through licensee Lazer Licenses, LLC

History
On August 1, 2017, KNEZ changed their format from news/talk to Spanish oldies, branded as "La Major". (info taken from stationintel.com)

KNEZ serves as the Reno, Nevada Spanish language affiliate for the San Francisco Giants Radio Network.

References

External links

NEZ
Radio stations established in 2009
2009 establishments in Nevada